Pedro de Morales (1538–1614) was a Spanish religious writer.

New Latin-language writers
1538 births
1614 deaths